The Hambantota Wind Farm was a wind farm in Hambantota, Sri Lanka, owned and operated by the state-run Ceylon Electricity Board. The wind farm, which was located along south-eastern coast of Hambantota was the country's first state owned wind farm, and consisted of five NEG Micon M1500-600 wind turbines of  each.

Foreign funds were raised by the Global Environmental Facility and the World Bank. Studies on the project dated as early as 1988, more than a decade before it was commissioned in 1999. The wind farm was decommissioned and dismantled in late 2018.

See also 

 List of power stations in Sri Lanka

References 

Wind farms in Sri Lanka
Buildings and structures in Hambantota